was a Japanese daimyō of the late Edo period who ruled the Sayama Domain of Kawachi Province. He succeeded to the family headship in 1861. Though Ujiyuki was named domainal governor (藩知事 han chiji) by the Meiji government, he willingly resigned this position in 1869.

External links
Information on Sayama-han (in Japanese)

1845 births
1919 deaths
Daimyo
Meiji Restoration